Indira Gandhi Stadium is a multi-purpose stadium used mostly for association football and field hockey and also for athletics in Alwar, Rajasthan, India. The ground first held a first-class match in December 1993 when Rajasthan played the Vidarbha in the 1993/94 Ranji Trophy.  The ground has held 4 further first-class matches, the last of which came in the 1995/96 Ranji Trophy when South Zone and the West Zone.

In October 2012, over 6,000 youths mobbed into the stadium while taking part in Army recruitment drive which on the rampage for four hours.

References

External links
 wikimapia
 ESPNcricinfo
 CricketArchive

Cricket grounds in Rajasthan
Monuments and memorials to Indira Gandhi
Alwar
Multi-purpose stadiums in India
Athletics (track and field) venues in India
Sports venues in Rajasthan
Buildings and structures in Alwar
Football venues in Rajasthan
1993 establishments in Rajasthan
Sports venues completed in 1993
20th-century architecture in India